Mount Oakleigh is mountain in Tasmania.

Ascending
Mount Oakleigh is generally ascended from New Pelion Hut, which can be accessed from the Arm River Track or the Overland Track. The mountain is in close proximity to Mt Ossa.

References 

Oakleigh